USS LST-493 was an  built for the United States Navy during World War II. Like many of her class, she was not named and is properly referred to by her hull designation.

Construction and commissioning
LST-493 was laid down on 9 August 1943, at Evansville, Indiana, by the Missouri Valley Bridge & Iron Company; launched on 4 October 1943; sponsored by Mrs. Charles M. Hoagland; and commissioned on 13 December 1943.

Service history
During World War II, LST-493 was assigned to the European Theater and participated in the Invasion of Normandy in June 1944. She grounded while attempting to enter Plymouth Harbor, England, on 12 April 1945, and was broken up and destroyed. The ship was struck from the Navy list on 19 May 1945.

Honors and awards
LST-493 earned one battle star for World War II service.

References

Bibliography

See also
 List of United States Navy LSTs

LST-491-class tank landing ships
World War II amphibious warfare vessels of the United States
Ships built in Evansville, Indiana
1943 ships